Ammangudi is a village in the Kumbakonam taluk of Thanjavur district, Tamil Nadu. It is the birthplace of Krishnan Raman Brahmarayar who served as the Commander-in-chief of the Chola army.

Demographics 

As per the 2001 census, Ammangudi had a total population of 1356 with 685 males and 671 females. The sex ratio was 980. The literacy rate was 78.64.

References 

Villages in Thanjavur district